Patrignone is a village in Marche, central Italy, administratively a frazione of the comune of Montalto delle Marche, province of Ascoli Piceno. At the time of the 2001 census its population was 130.

Patrignone is about 2 km from Montalto and 33 km from Ascoli Piceno.

References 

Frazioni of the Province of Ascoli Piceno